Rawdon/Camping Pontbriand (Hydro) Water Aerodrome  is located  west northwest of Rawdon, Quebec, Canada.

References

Registered aerodromes in Lanaudière
Seaplane bases in Quebec